Domonique Foxworth (born March 27, 1983) is a former American football cornerback who played in the National Football League (NFL). Foxworth played college football for the University of Maryland. He was drafted by the Denver Broncos in the third round of the 2005 NFL Draft.

Early life
Foxworth was born in Oxford, England, during his father's career in the United States Army. The family relocated to Maryland when Foxworth was kindergarten-aged. Foxworth has one older brother.

Foxworth played high school football at Western Tech (officially, Western School of Technology and Environmental Science), where he was named to the Baltimore Sun's first-team All-Metro and All-Baltimore County.

College football career
After graduating early from high school in the fall of 2000, Foxworth enrolled at the University of Maryland and signed with the Terrapins in early 2001. While playing for the Terrapins, Foxworth started every game between 2001 and September 2004, and received All-Atlantic Coast Conference (ACC) honors three times.

Professional career

National Football League

Foxworth began his career in the NFL after being drafted by the Denver Broncos in the third round, with the 97th overall pick of the 2005 NFL Draft. The Broncos traded Foxworth to the Atlanta Falcons in September 2008 for a conditional seventh-round pick in the 2009 NFL Draft.

On the first day of training camp for the 2010 season, Foxworth tore his ACL, causing him to miss the entire season. Foxworth's knee problems continued into 2011, with the Ravens putting him on the injured reserve list after playing only two games, ending his season early. In May 2012, Foxworth announced that he planned to retire.

NFL Players Association
In addition to his work on the field, Foxworth has also held a number of positions with the NFL Players Association. In 2007, the Broncos elected Foxworth as an NFLPA player representative, and the following year he became the youngest player to become vice president of the NFLPA Executive Committee.

In 2012, Foxworth was elected president of the NFLPA without opposition.

NFL statistics
Source:

Post-NFL playing career

Education 
Following retirement from the NFL and while serving as the NFL Players Association president, Foxworth attended Harvard Business School and earned an MBA.

Commentating career 
Foxworth is now a writer with The Undefeated and host of The Morning Roast on ESPN Radio with Clinton Yates and Mina Kimes. He is also a regular guest on The Mike O'Meara Show and other ESPN Radio talk shows such as First Take, The Bill Barnwell Show podcast, Golic and Wingo, and The Dan Le Batard Show with Stugotz, as well as The Right Time with Bomani Jones, which he appears on every Friday. Foxworth is also a frequent guest on the ESPN morning show Get Up! and Highly Questionable (now called Debatable). He also hosted Pardon the Interruption on August 26, 2022. As of September 7, 2022, he hosts the podcast The Domonique Foxworth Show.

Community service
While with the Denver Broncos, Foxworth worked with the Boys & Girls Clubs of America, taking a leading role in the fundraising and planning for the Darrent Williams Memorial Teen Center, a social and scholastic retreat for teens, named in honor of murdered Broncos player Darrent Williams. Foxworth also created Baltimore BORN Inc to provide lower income high school boys with resources and networking opportunities. In 2010, Foxworth received the first annual Tim Wheatley Award from the Baltimore Sun Media Group for his community service work.

References

External links
Maryland Terrapins bio

1983 births
American football cornerbacks
American football safeties
Atlanta Falcons players
Baltimore Ravens players
Denver Broncos players
ESPN people
Harvard Business School alumni
Living people
Maryland Terrapins football players
People from Catonsville, Maryland
Players of American football from Maryland
Presidents of the National Football League Players Association
Sportspeople from Baltimore County, Maryland
Trade unionists from Maryland
African-American sports journalists